Hemiblossiola is a monotypic genus of daesiid camel spiders, first described by Carl Friedrich Roewer in 1933. Its single species, Hemiblossiola kraepelini is distributed in South Africa.

References 

Solifugae
Arachnid genera
Monotypic arachnid genera